Leutfred may refer to: 
Liutfrid, Duke of Alsace (died 742), the third in a line of Etichonid dukes dating back to circa 670
Leutfred, duke of Alamannia, see Alemanni